An optic axis of a crystal is a direction in which a ray of transmitted light suffers no birefringence (double refraction). An optic axis is a direction rather than a single line: all rays that are parallel to that direction exhibit the same lack of birefringence.

Crystals may have a single optic axis, in which case they are uniaxial, or two different optic axes, in which case they are biaxial. Non-crystalline materials generally have no birefringence and thus, no optic axis. A uniaxial crystal (e.g. calcite, quartz) is isotropic within the plane orthogonal to the optic axis of the crystal.

Explanation
The internal structure of crystals (the specific structure of the crystal lattice, and the specific atoms or molecules of which it is composed) causes the speed of light in the material, and therefore the material's refractive index, to depend on both the light's direction of propagation and its polarization. The dependence on polarization causes birefringence, in which two perpendicular polarizations propagate at different speeds and refract at different angles in the crystal. This causes a ray of light to split into an ordinary ray and an extraordinary ray, with orthogonal polarizations. For light propagating along an optic axis, though, the speed does not depend on the polarization, so there is no birefringence although there can be optical activity (a rotation of the plane of polarization).

The refractive index of the ordinary ray is constant for any direction in the crystal. The refractive index of the extraordinary ray varies depending on its direction.

Liquid crystal directors
The mobile axis of a liquid crystal is called a director. It is the space and time average of the orientation of the long molecular axis within a small volume element of material demonstrating a mesophase. Electrical manipulation of the director enables liquid-crystal displays.

See also 
 Crystal optics
 Index ellipsoid

Notes and references

Polarization (waves)
Optical mineralogy